All Hail may refer to:
 All Hail (Kïll Cheerleadër album)
 All Hail (Norma Jean album)
 All Hail (film)